Daniel Sam (born 7 January 1994) is a Ghanaian badminton player. He competed at the 2010, 2014 and 2018 Commonwealth Games. In 2011, he won the bronze medal at the All-Africa Games in the men's doubles event partnered with Solomon Mensah Nyarko. He was one of the 14 players selected for the Road to Rio Program, a program that aimed to help African badminton players to compete at the 2016 Olympic Games. Having faced disciplinary issues including  being suspended for six times in ten years, he was banned for 6 years by his national governing body of the sport, after a disciplinary hearing in 2021

Achievements

All-Africa Games 
Men's doubles

BWF International Challenge/Series
Mixed doubles

 BWF International Challenge tournament
 BWF International Series tournament
 BWF Future Series tournament

References

External links
 

1994 births
Living people
People from Sekondi-Takoradi
Ghanaian male badminton players
Badminton players at the 2010 Commonwealth Games
Badminton players at the 2014 Commonwealth Games
Badminton players at the 2018 Commonwealth Games
Commonwealth Games competitors for Ghana
Competitors at the 2011 All-Africa Games
Competitors at the 2015 African Games
Competitors at the 2019 African Games
African Games bronze medalists for Ghana
African Games medalists in badminton